Frederico Castro Roque dos Santos (born 14 August 1979), known as Freddy, is an Angolan retired footballer who played as a forward.

He spent most of his professional career in Portugal and Cyprus.

Club career
Born in Malanje, Freddy spent nine seasons at G.D. Estoril Praia – youth years comprised – playing two seasons in the Portuguese third division and one in the second as a senior. In 2001–02 he made his Primeira Liga debut, being coached by a young José Mourinho and playing 22 matches (17 as a substitute) as the team qualified to the UEFA Intertoto Cup; during four years, he only started in 16 of the league appearances he made.

Freddy started 2005–06 with Moreirense F.C. in the second level, but transferred to Al-Gharafa Sports Club from Qatar in the next transfer window. He would also split the following campaign, between C.D. Aves (Portuguese top flight) and Malaysia's Negeri Sembilan FA, appearing in six AFC Cup games during his short spell with the latter and scoring three goals.

In summer 2007, Freddy moved countries again, signing with Doxa Katokopias FC in Cyprus. In January of the following year, he stayed in the country and joined Enosis Neon Paralimni FC.

Still in Cyprus, in January 2009 Freddy signed for AEL Limassol, scoring a combined 20 Cypriot First Division goals in his first two full seasons but seeing his team come out empty in silverware.

International career
Freddy appeared for Angola during the 2006 FIFA World Cup qualification campaign, scoring his only international goal in a 1–0 home win against Rwanda, on 5 September 2004. The Palancas Negras eventually qualified for the final stages in Germany – a first-ever – but he was overlooked for the final squad of 23.

Honours
Omonia
Cypriot Cup: 2011–12
Cypriot Super Cup: 2012

References

External links

1979 births
Living people
Footballers from Malanje
Portuguese sportspeople of Angolan descent
Angolan footballers
Association football forwards
Primeira Liga players
Liga Portugal 2 players
Segunda Divisão players
G.D. Estoril Praia players
U.D. Leiria players
Moreirense F.C. players
C.D. Aves players
Qatar Stars League players
Al-Gharafa SC players
Malaysia Super League players
Negeri Sembilan FA players
Cypriot First Division players
Doxa Katokopias FC players
Enosis Neon Paralimni FC players
AEL Limassol players
AC Omonia players
Girabola players
C.D. Primeiro de Agosto players
C.R. Caála players
Angola international footballers
Angolan expatriate footballers
Expatriate footballers in Portugal
Expatriate footballers in Qatar
Expatriate footballers in Malaysia
Expatriate footballers in Cyprus
Angolan expatriate sportspeople in Portugal
Angolan expatriate sportspeople in Malaysia
Angolan expatriate sportspeople in Cyprus